Asthenotricha torata is a moth in the family Geometridae first described by Louis Beethoven Prout in 1932. It is found on Grande Comore in the Comoros and on Madagascar.

References

Asthenotricha
Moths of the Comoros
Moths of Madagascar
Moths described in 1932
Taxa named by Louis Beethoven Prout